The 1804–05 United States House of Representatives elections were held on various dates in various states between April 24, 1804 (in New York) and August 5, 1805 (in Tennessee). Each state set its own date for its elections to the House of Representatives before the first session of the 9th United States Congress convened on December 2, 1805. The elections occurred at the same time as President Thomas Jefferson's re-election. Elections were held for all 142 seats, representing 17 states.

Under Jefferson's popular administration, his party continued to gain seats in the House. Territorial acquisitions from the Louisiana Purchase and economic expansion gave voters a positive view of the Democratic-Republicans, whose majority, already commanding in the 8th Congress, now surpassed three-quarters of the total membership. Following this election, Federalists were able to secure few seats outside of New England and party legitimacy deteriorated as political thought turned away from Federalist ideals perceived to be elitist and anti-democratic.

Election summaries

Special elections 

There were special elections in 1804 and 1805 during the 8th United States Congress and 9th United States Congress.

Elections are sorted here by date then district.

8th Congress

9th Congress

Connecticut

Delaware

Georgia

Indiana Territory 
See Non-voting delegates, below.

Kentucky

Maryland

Massachusetts 

The majority requirement was met in all 17 districts in the 1804 elections.

Mississippi Territory 
See Non-voting delegates, below.

New Hampshire

New Jersey 

The Federalist ticket was announced only a week before the election, with no active campaigning.

New York 

New York held elections for the 9th Congress on April 24–26, 1804.  For this year and the next election year, the 2nd and 3rd districts had combined returns, effectively a plural district with 2 seats, though still numbered as separate districts.  At the time, District 2 consisted of only part of New York County, while District 3 consisted of the remainder of New York County plus Kings and Richmond Counties.  By consolidating the two, it ensured that New York County would be combined into a single district.

North Carolina

Ohio

Pennsylvania

Rhode Island

South Carolina

Tennessee 

Beginning with the 9th Congress, Tennessee was divided into 3 districts.

Vermont 

Vermont required a majority for election, which frequently mandated runoff elections.  The , and  districts both required second elections in this election cycle, and  districts both required second elections in this election cyclethe 3rd district required a third election.

Virginia

Non-voting delegates 

There were three territories with non-voting delegates in the 9th Congress, one of which (the Orleans Territory) did not send its first representative until 1806.  The delegates were elected by the territorial legislatures, votes here are the number of members of the territorial legislatures voting for each candidate.

In the Mississippi Territory, the territorial legislature was locked.  The first vote given above was on the 7th ballot, after which point the territorial legislature adjourned, the second vote was at a later session of the territorial legislature.

|-
| 
| colspan=3 | None (District created)
|  | New delegate elected September 11, 1805.Federalist gain.New delegate was seated December 12, 1805.
| nowrap | First ballot: Second ballot: Third ballot: 

|-
| 
| William Lattimore
|  | Democratic-Republican
| 1803
| Incumbent re-elected on an unknown date in 1805.
| nowrap | Seventh ballot:Eventual decision:

|}

See also 
 1804 United States elections
 List of United States House of Representatives elections (1789–1822)
 1804–05 United States Senate elections
 1804 United States presidential election
 9th United States Congress

Notes

References

Bibliography

External links 
 Office of the Historian (Office of Art & Archives, Office of the Clerk, U.S. House of Representatives)